Edinburgh Northern Rugby Football Club is a rugby union club in the Scottish Rugby Union, located at Inverleith Park, by Stockbridge and Fettes in the centre of Edinburgh, playing in the  league.

History

Founded in 1920, Edinburgh Northern has a fine tradition of being one of the friendliest clubs in Edinburgh. The club's playing colours are Navy Blue and Old Gold.

The Club regularly fields two XVs in competitive regional leagues and also has an additional 'Over 35s' team, the Gentlemen of Northern, for players who wish to continue playing in their later years.

Edinburgh Northern Sevens

Northern host one of the city's largest annual Sevens tournaments every April, which attracts entrants from all over the UK and hold an excellent reputation as a host for touring clubs from all Great Britain, Ireland and Europe visiting Edinburgh.

Honours

Edinburgh Northern Sevens
 Champions: (4) 1955, 1958, 1959, 1966
Edinburgh District Sevens
 Champions: (1) 1957

References

External links 

Official website
Scottish Rugby Union website

Rugby union in Edinburgh
Sports teams in Edinburgh
Scottish rugby union teams